Abul Hashem Khan is a Bangladesh Awami League politician and the incumbent Jatiya Sangsad member representing the Comilla-5.

Career 
Hashem Khan is the president of Burichang Upazila Awami League and former PP. When Abdul Matin Khasru, Member of Parliament for Comilla-5 constituency, died on 14 April 2021, he was elected unopposed as a Member of Parliament on 24 June 2021 in the by-election of the vacant constituency.

References 

Living people
Year of birth missing (living people)
11th Jatiya Sangsad members
People from Comilla District
Awami League politicians